You Hongfei is a soprano at the China National Opera and a National A-class Performer of China.

You was born in Hulan District in Harbin, the capital of Heilongjiang province. She graduated from the Department of Opera of China Conservatory of Music in 1996 and joined China National Opera as an opera singer. She is a member of the council of Chinese Musicians' Association and a member of Ministry of Culture of the People's Republic of China Youth Federation. Awarded 'Honorable artist' by the Peking University Hall and named one of China's Top 10 Sopranos by CCTV China Central Television Music Channel. A visiting professor at Harbin Conservatory of Music.

Opera career 

During the pursuit of her career, You gave special attention to the performance of original Chinese operas.

Concerts and other performances 

You co-performed concerts with China National Symphony Orchestra, China Philharmonic Orchestra, Beijing Symphony Orchestra, Shanghai Philharmonic Orchestra, China National Opera House Symphony Orchestra, China National Opera & Dance Theater Symphony Orchestra, Beijing Film Philharmonic and German Modern Orchestra, etc.

You Hongfei was a featured guest singer at José Carreras 's Beijing Solo concert. She was the leading soprano inSymphony No. 9 (Beethoven) and Requiem (Mozart) in the concert with China National Symphony Orchestra. She performed with Jean-Michel Jarre inside the Forbidden City and attended the opening ceremony of Les Années Chine-France, which was broadcast to over 2.5 billion viewers worldwide. She has performed in countries and regions around the world including France, Germany, Australia, North Korea, Laos, Macau, Hong Kong and Taiwan, etc. She also made appearances in domestic galas held by Chinese government and organizations, among which include the CCTV New Year's Gala.

Awards

References 

Year of birth missing (living people)
Living people
Chinese sopranos
Singers from Heilongjiang
People from Harbin
China Conservatory of Music alumni